Bee Hive is a  Navajo Sandstone mountain in Zion National Park in Washington County, Utah, United States, that is part of the Towers of the Virgin.

Description
Bee Hive is located north of the park headquarters at the south entrance to Zion Canyon. Neighbors include Altar of Sacrifice and Meridian Tower to the west, and The Sentinel to the northeast. The peak's descriptive name is for the beehive shape of the summit. This name was officially adopted in 1934 by the U.S. Board on Geographic Names. Precipitation runoff from the mountain drains into the North Fork Virgin River.

Climate
Spring and fall are the most favorable seasons to see Bee Hive Peak. According to the Köppen climate classification system, it is located in a Cold semi-arid climate zone, which is defined by the coldest month having an average mean temperature below 32 °F (0 °C), and at least 50% of the total annual precipitation being received during the spring and summer.

Climbing Regulations 
A bivouac permit is required from the park visitor center for any climbs expected to last overnight.

Gallery

See also

 List of mountains of Utah
 Geology of the Zion and Kolob canyons area
 Colorado Plateau

References

External links

Zion National Park National Park Service
 Bee Hive: Weather forecast

Mountains of Utah
Zion National Park
Mountains of Washington County, Utah
Colorado Plateau
North American 2000 m summits